The Kuunga orogeny (from Swahili, "to unite") was an orogeny that occurred in South-east Africa during the Ediacaran and Cambrian.  Composed of three separate orogenic belts (Damara, Zambesi, and Lurio) that are slightly younger than the East African orogeny, the Kuunga orogeny documents the collision between north and south Gondwana, or what is today Dronning Maud Land in Antarctica and northern Mozambique in Africa.

The name was proposed in 1995 by  J. G. Meert, R. van der Voo and S. Ayub.

References

Sources

 
 

Orogenies of Africa